Wilfrid Boulineau (born 13 May 1970 in Rouen) is a retired French decathlete. He finished sixth at the 1999 World Championships and twentieth at the 2000 Olympic Games. His personal best result was 8312 points, achieved in May 1999 in Arles.

Achievements

External links

1970 births
Living people
French decathletes
Athletes (track and field) at the 2000 Summer Olympics
Olympic athletes of France
Sportspeople from Rouen